Morbo may refer to:
Morbo, morbid fascination and antagonism, descriptive of the attitudes relating to the network of identities and relationships between Spanish football clubs; see Spanish football rivalries
Morbo, an alien news anchor on the animated television series Futurama
Morbo (band), a Mexican band
Morbo (album)
Morbo (film), a 1972 Spanish film by Gonzalo Suárez